The Robertson Nature Reserve is a protected rainforest nature reserve that is located in the Southern Highlands region of New South Wales, in eastern Australia. The  reserve is situated near  on the edge of the Illawarra Escarpment and is a remnant of the Yarrawa Brush, once  in size.

Features
A  track through the forest is suitable to wheelchairs, with several signs with information on local plants and animals.

Because of small size and isolation, the reserve is subject to weed attack. Chinese Privet and Glossy Privet, Holly and Himalayan Blackberry being particularly troublesome.

The rainforest is categorised as warm temperate rainforest, (not cool temperate), with the canopy dominated by trees such as Golden Sassafras, Coachwood, Lilly Pilly, Native Daphne, Possumwood, Beefwood, Featherwood and Blackwood. Genuine cool temperate rainforest trees such as Pinkwood and Black Olive Berry are either absent or inconspicuous. A common tree species is the Brown Beech, usually associated with tropical or sub-tropical rainforests.

See also

 Protected areas of New South Wales

References

External links

Nature reserves in New South Wales
Forests of New South Wales
Southern Highlands (New South Wales)
1979 establishments in Australia
Protected areas established in 1979